Chinatown, Portland may refer to:
 Old Town Chinatown, Portland, Oregon
 Chinatown, Portland, Maine